Mr Qenan Al-Ghamdi (Arabic: قينان الغامدي) is a Saudi Arabian journalist and former editor in chief of Al-Watan (Arabic: جريدة الوطن السعودية), a popular newspaper based in the south of Saudi Arabia.

References

Living people
Saudi Arabian journalists
Asian newspaper editors
Year of birth missing (living people)